Dilara is a 2018 Pakistani television drama series aired on Bol Entertainment, written by Bee Gul and directed by Khalid Ahmed. It features Kinza Razzak in the titular role, alongside Abid Ali, Usman Butt and Umer Naru in prominent roles.

The series is a modren-day adaptation of Munshi Premchand's Nirmala.

Plot 
The story starts with Dilara who is in love with Mohsin and are about to marry. Dilara's family is not so rich and her father, Akbar Ali tries to fulfill demands of Mohsin's parents in the name of dowry however, meets with an accident on road and dies. After his death, Mohsin and his parents disappear and do not try to contact with Dilara and her family. One day, her mother (Zehra) calls them where Dilara herself calls off the marriage due to her self-respect. Zehra than marries Dilara to Nawab Salahuddin, a rich Nawab who is 32 years older than Dilara. Dilara goes to Nawab's house where he lives with his sister, Khanam and two sons (from previous marriage). Khanam behaves strictly with Dilara while Nawab's sons make fun with her. One day, Nawab's elder son, Nawab Shujauddin who is a doctor, reveals to Dilara that Mohsin is his class fellow, to which Dilara shocks.

Cast 
 Kinza Razzak as Dilara
 Abid Ali as Nawab Salahuddin
 Usman Butt as Nawab Shujauddin
  Ramsha Kohati  as Saman
 Umer Naru as Dr. Mohsin
 Hina Khawaja Bayat as Khanam
 Rabya Kulsoom as Choti
 Samina Ahmed as Zehra
 Syed Mohammad Ahmed as Akbar Ali
 Khalid Ahmed as Akbar Ali's elder brother
 Saleem Mairaj as Meeru

References 

2018 Pakistani television series debuts
2019 Pakistani television series endings
Pakistani drama television series
Urdu-language television shows